The  is a Japanese literary award for unpublished genre fiction novels, mainly for mystery novels. It was established in 1996 by the editors of Mephisto magazine and is awarded on an irregular basis. The winning work is published by Kodansha and the winner receives a statue of Sherlock Holmes.

Winners whose works are available in English 
 Writers engaged in The BBB
The BBB is a publishing group in which some Mephisto Prize winners participate. The group was established in 2012 by Ryusui Seiryoin and other Mephisto Prize winners to translate their works into English and publish them as ebooks.
 Hiroshi Mori
 Ryusui Seiryoin (Chief Editing Officer of The BBB)
 Kenichi Sobu
 Kyosuke Tsumiki
 Takafumi Takada
 Ryosuke Akizuki
 Ryuoh Yano

Other writers
 Otaro Maijo
 Yuya Sato
 Nisio Isin

Winners

Mephisto (magazine) 
 is a Japanese literary magazine of genre fiction, mainly of mystery fiction. It has been published triannually by Kodansha since April 1994.

Koji Suzuki's Promenade of the Gods was serialized in the magazine from 1995 to 2002. The first three stories of Nisio Isin's Monogatari series were published in the magazine in 2005-2006.

Short stories available in English translation which were originally published in Mephisto magazine 
Hiroshi Mori
 "The Girl Who Was the Little Bird" (December 1997 issue)
 "A Pair of Hearts" (October 1998 issue)
 "Which Is the Witch?" (September 1999 issue)
Rintaro Norizuki
 "An Urban Legend Puzzle" (September 2001 issue)
Soji Shimada
 "The Locked House of Pythagoras" (September 1999 issue)
 Takafumi Takada
 "Three Little Bonzes: The Case Diary of Chinami Chiba" (September 2000 issue)
 "A Goat on a Boat to Float: The Case Diary of Chinami Chiba" (September 2002 issue)

Contributors

See also 
Japanese mystery awards for unpublished novels
 Edogawa Rampo Prize
 Ayukawa Tetsuya Award
 Agatha Christie Award
Japanese mystery awards for best works published in the previous year
 Mystery Writers of Japan Award
 Honkaku Mystery Award

References

External links 
 Official Website of Mephisto magazine 
 The BBB: Breakthrough Bandwagon Books - Website of some Mephisto Prize winners 

1996 establishments in Japan
Mystery and detective fiction awards
Japanese literary awards
Awards established in 1996
Kodansha
Nisio Isin